Rogers County is located in the northeastern part of the U.S. state of Oklahoma. As of the 2020 census, the population was 95,240, making it the sixth-most populous county in Oklahoma. The county seat is Claremore. Rogers County is included in the Tulsa, OK Metropolitan Statistical Area.

Created in 1907 from the western Saline District of the Cherokee Nation, this area was named the Cooweescoowee District, and Cooweescoowee County at the time of statehood. However, the residents protested, and the name was changed to Rogers County, after Clem Vann Rogers, a prominent Cherokee rancher, and father of Will Rogers.

History

According to the Encyclopedia of Oklahoma History and Culture, the Arkansas Band of the Osage Nation settled in the Three Forks area (the junction of the Arkansas River, Grand River, and Verdigris River during the 1760s and established two villages called Pasuga and Pasona in what is now Rogers County. Pasona was near an ancient earthwork platform mound near the Verdigris River. It was later called Claremore Mound, to honor Osage chief Claremore (aka Gra-mon in Osage, meaning Arrow Going Home; his name was first recorded by French colonists as Clermont.)

In 1828, Cherokee bands who had left the Southeast early exchanged their Arkansas land for an area that included present-day Rogers County. This had been ceded by the Osage in 1825 under a treaty to the United States.  The area became organized by the Cherokee Nation as the Saline District of their portion of Indian Territory. In 1907 the western portion of that district was organized as the Cooweescoowee District.

Upon statehood in 1908, the district was designated as a county named Cooweescoowee. Residents supported renaming the  county in honor of Clement Vann Rogers, an early Cherokee settler and prominent rancher here.

Shortly after statehood, Eastern University Preparatory School was established on College Hill, just west of Claremore, Oklahoma.  The Oklahoma Military Academy, established in 1919, took over the facility.  In 1971 the academy was closed and the facility was converted for use by Claremore Junior College.  As a four-year curriculum and graduate departments were added, the state legislature renamed the institution as Rogers State College and Rogers University, before settling in 1998 on the current Rogers State University.

Geography

The largest body of water is Lake Oologah. The main streams are the Caney River and the Verdigris River. There are also several smaller creeks and lakes in the county.

Adjacent counties
 Nowata County (north)
 Craig County (northeast)
 Mayes County (east)
 Wagoner County (south)
 Tulsa County (southwest)
 Washington County (northwest)

Demographics

As of the census of 2010, there were 86,905 people, 31,884 households, and 24,088 families residing in the county.  The population density was 105 people per square mile (40/km2).  There were 27,476 housing units at an average density of 41 per square mile (16/km2).  The racial makeup of the county was 75.3% White, 1.0% Black or African American, 13.1% Native American, 1.1% Asian (0.5% Hmong, 0.1% Filipino, 0.1% Indian), 0.1% Pacific Islander, 1.4% from other races, and 8.1% from two or more races.  Of the population 3.7% were Hispanic or Latino of any race (2.7% Mexican, 0.3% Puerto Rican, 0.2% Spanish, 0.1% Peruvian). 18.1% were of German, 13.8% Irish, 8.7% English, 3.0% French, 2.5% Scottish, and 2.2% Italian ancestries.

96.7% spoke English, 1.7% Spanish, and 0.4% German as their first language.

There were 31,884 households, out of which 38.40% had children under the age of 18 living with them, 65.60% were married couples living together, 8.90% had a female householder with no husband present, and 21.90% were non-families. Of all households, 19.00% were made up of individuals, and 7.50% had someone living alone who was 65 years of age or older.  The average household size was 2.71 and the average family size was 3.10.

In the county, the population was spread out, with 28.70% under the age of 18, 7.40% from 18 to 24, 28.60% from 25 to 44, 24.00% from 45 to 64, and 11.30% who were 65 years of age or older.  The median age was 36 years. For every 100 females, there were 96.80 males.  For every 100 females age 18 and over, there were 94.40 males.

The median income for a household in the county was $58,434 and the median income for a family was $67,691. The per capita income for the county was $26,400.  About 7.2% of families and 9.9% of the population were below the poverty line, including 13.3% of those under age 18 and 7.3% of those aged 65 or over.

Politics

Communities

Cities
 Catoosa
 Claremore (county seat)
 Collinsville (primarily in Tulsa County)
 Owasso (primarily in Tulsa County)
 Tulsa (primarily in Tulsa County)

Towns

 Chelsea
 Fair Oaks (primarily in Wagoner County)
 Foyil
 Inola
 Oologah
 Talala
 Valley Park
 Verdigris

Census-designated places
 Bushyhead
 Gregory
 Justice
 Limestone
 Sequoyah
 Tiawah

Unincorporated communities
 Jamestown
 Keetonville

Education
School districts include:

K-12:

 Catoosa Public Schools
 Chelsea Public Schools
 Chouteau-Mazie Public Schools
 Claremore Public Schools
 Collinsville Public Schools
 Foyil Public Schools
 Inola Public Schools
 Oologah-Talala Public Schools
 Owasso Public Schools
 Sequoyah Public Schools
 Verdigris Public Schools

K-8:
 Justus-Tiawah Public Schools

NRHP sites

The following sites in Rogers County are listed on the National Register of Historic Places:
 I.W.W. Beck Building, Oologah
 The Belvidere, Claremore
 Chelsea Motel, Chelsea
 Claremore Auto Dealership, Claremore
 Eastern University Preparatory School, Claremore
 Ed Galloway's Totem Pole Park, Foyil
 Hanes Home, Sageeyah
 Hogue House, Chelsea
 Mendenhall's Bath House, Claremore
 Maurice Meyer Barracks, Claremore
 Oologah Bank, Oologah
 Oologah Pump, Oologah
 Pryor Creek Bridge, Chelsea
 Will Rogers Birthplace, Oologah
 Will Rogers Hotel, Claremore
 Verdigris Club Lodge, Catoosa

References

External links
 Rogers County Government's website
 Rogers County Genealogy page
 Oklahoma Digital Maps: Digital Collections of Oklahoma and Indian Territory
 Voices of Oklahoma interview with Frank Robson. First person interview conducted on November 2, 2009, with Frank Robson referencing the history of Rogers County, Oklahoma. Original audio and transcript archived with Voices of Oklahoma oral history project.

 
1907 establishments in Oklahoma
Populated places established in 1907
Tulsa metropolitan area